Chang Myung-su (born 6 March 1956) is a South Korean former figure skater. She competed in the ladies' singles event at the 1972 Winter Olympics.

References

1956 births
Living people
South Korean female single skaters
Olympic figure skaters of South Korea
Figure skaters at the 1972 Winter Olympics
Place of birth missing (living people)